Father of Invention is a 2010 American comedy-drama film directed by Trent Cooper, and stars Kevin Spacey, Camilla Belle and Johnny Knoxville.

Synopsis 
Robert Axle, a New Orleans-based infomercial guru, loses it all when one of his inventions maims thousands of customers. After eight years in a maximum-security prison, Axle is ready to redeem his name and rebuild his billion-dollar empire. But first he must convince his estranged daughter to let him live with her and her quirky, over-protective roommates.

Cast 
 Kevin Spacey as Robert Axle
 Virginia Madsen as Lorraine
 John Stamos as Steven "Steve" Leslie Thurmond
 Johnny Knoxville as Troy Coangelo
 Camilla Belle as Claire Elizabeth (formerly Axle but dropped the last name after her father went to prison.)
 Heather Graham as Phoebe
 Michael Rosenbaum as Eddie
 Anna Anissimova as Donna
 Craig Robinson as Jerry
 Rhoda Griffis as Penny Camp
 Jack McGee
 Danny Comden as Matt James
 Marc Macaulay as Grocery Store Clerk
 Audra Marie as Businessman's Date
 Mary Elizabeth Cobb as Sheila
 Julia Lashae as Lily’s Mother

Reception
On Rotten Tomatoes the film has a 0% rating based on reviews from 16 critics, with an average rating of 3.82/10.
On Metacritic the film has a score of 36% based on reviews from 8 critics, indicating "generally unfavorable reviews".

Kirk Honeycutt of The Hollywood Reporter wrote: "Comedies don't get much more unfunny than Father of Invention, a lame and somewhat preachy comic take on a father trying to get back into his daughter's good graces."

References

External links 
 
 

2010 films
2010 comedy-drama films
American comedy-drama films
Films shot in New Orleans
2010s English-language films
2010s American films